The second season of Australian Survivor, also known as Australian Celebrity Survivor and Celebrity Survivor: Vanuatu, is a television series based on the international reality game show franchise Survivor. The season featured 12 Australian celebrity contestants competing on the Vanuatuan island of Éfaté over 25 days for a grand prize of A$100,000 for the winner's chosen charity. It was hosted by television personality and former record company executive Ian "Dicko" Dickson.

After 25 days on the island, surf lifesaving champion Guy Leech was named the "Sole Survivor" in a 3–2 jury vote over actor Justin Melvey. Guy donated his A$100,000 charity prize to Ride Aid Inc while the charities of the other players each received a donation of A$5,000.

The season aired on the Seven Network in 2006, the same year the network aired other celebrity-oriented reality programs including It Takes Two and Dancing with the Stars. Although better received than the Nine Network's 2002 season, Seven's Celebrity Survivor series was still only a modest success in the ratings and was not renewed by the Seven Network. A third Australian Survivor was not produced until 10 years later when Network Ten picked up the rights to the franchise and produced a third season which aired in 2016.

Production

Conception
In 2006, Nine Network held the rights to screen the American edition of Survivor and the licence to produce a local edition of Survivor, which resulted in Nine's 2002 edition of Australian Survivor. However, the Seven Network found a loophole in their contract and obtained the rights to produce Australian Celebrity Survivor, as Castaway Television views the Celebrity Survivor format as a different format from the regular format. Castaway Television, who produced Nine's series, was again involved in the production of this second Australian season of Survivor.

Filming and development
The show was filmed on the island of Éfaté in Vanuatu, which was used for the 9th season of the American edition (Survivor: Vanuatu - Islands of Fire) and the 6th season of the French edition (Koh-Lanta: Vanuatu). Production of the series took place over twenty-five days, from late May to early June 2006, with promotional advertising beginning in July. The executive producer of Celebrity Survivor was David Mason, who also produced other shows on the Seven Network, such as Medical Emergency and The Mole.

Promotion
Before the series began, Dickson and a few of the Celebrity Survivor contestants appeared on the Seven Network's breakfast news show, Sunrise, to promote the series. This paralleled what occurs in the American version, when the show is promoted on The Early Show, CBS' own breakfast news program, and what happened during the Nine Network's Australian Survivor venture, when the series was featured on the early morning show, Today and A Current Affair.
Two of the season's contestants, Amber Petty and Nicolle Dickson, also appeared in television commercials for Olay Total Effects, which were broadcast during the series.

Contestants
On Day 1, nine of the twelve players were divided based on gender into two tribes. The five women composed the Moso tribe and the four men made up the Kakula tribe. Later on Day 1, a player of the opposite gender joined each tribe, and for winning the first immunity challenge, Kakula received a former soldier and survival expert as their sixth tribe member. On Day 6, the ten remaining players were redistributed into two mixed-gender tribes of five. 

On Day 12, the seven remaining players merged into the Tanna tribe. These players made up the two finalists and the five members of the jury, who ultimately decided who would be the "Sole Survivor".

Season summary
Nine of the twelve celebrity castaways were divided into two tribes based on gender: Kakula (men) and Moso (women). A player of the opposite gender joined each tribe later on day 1 (Justin on Moso and Gabrielle on Kakula), and Kakula won an additional tribe member for winning the first immunity challenge (“survival expert” Ben). A tribe swap on day 6 sent David & Elton to Moso and Imogen & Nicolle to Kakula, and the tribes merged into the Tanna tribe on day 12.

Initially, the players joined forces to eliminate Guy first, for being the most obvious physical threat, and Elton soon followed for the same reason. The tribe turned on Justin due to him allegedly making a monetary deal with Gabrielle for him to remain in the game, and Gabrielle was the next to go after her ally. The first four voted out since the merge competed for a chance to re-enter the game, with Guy and Justin emerging victorious. David, Imogen, and Nicolle's attempts to vote the two of them out again due to their newfound threat status were futile, and they were all eliminated by Guy and Justin, who reached the final two. In the end, the jury sided with Guy, and he won the prize money for his charity.

In the case of multiple tribes or castaways who win reward or immunity, they are listed in order of finish, or alphabetically where it was a team effort; where one castaway won and invited others, the invitees are in brackets.

Notes

Episodes

Voting history

Notes

References

External links
Australian Reality Television Blog

2006 Australian television seasons
Celebrity reality television series
Australian Survivor seasons
Television shows filmed in Vanuatu